Institution of Diploma Engineers, Bangladesh, widely known as IDEB  is a professional organization for Diploma Engineers & Diploma in Architect of Bangladesh, that established on 8 November 1970. The aim is to make a union among diploma engineers and serve as the engineering community, who are also being known as a people's engineer in Bangladesh and engineering profession.

IDEB is a multidisciplinary organization of engineering societies which dedicated for advancing the knowledge, understanding and practice of engineering sector. To formulate the overall policy of Institution, it has a national council consisting 500 members. IDEB has also 11 member advisory council.

Membership 
Diploma Engineer and / or a person having post Matriculation or Post Secondary School Certificate (SSC) with 3 or 4 years of schooling on Engineering and Technology and on successful completion be awarded a Diploma in Engineering by any University or Education Board of UK, USA, India, Pakistan and Bangladesh and/or as recognized by the Government of Bangladesh is eligible for membership of IDEB. IDEB offered six category membership i.e. Student Member, General Member, Fellow Member, Life Member, Donor Member and Honorary Member.

General Member 
Any person passed Diploma in Engineering from Banlgadesh Govt. recognized educational institute and obtained certificate from Bangladesh Technical Education Board (BTTB) is eligible for the membership of this institution. But he/she has to apply in the prescribed from of the Institute for the membership and be awarded with Membership Certificate.

Student Member 
All students of the Diploma-in Engineering course in Polytechnic and Technical Institute and their equivalents shall be eligible to become student member of the Institution subject to be conditions as prescribed in constitution or as may decided by the Central Executive Committee from time to time.

Life Member 
Any member shall be entitled to be life member subscribing an amount of Tk. 10,000/- (Ten Thousand) to the IDEB Fund at a time.

Fellow Member 
Any member completed 25 years of his membership and he/she was/is associated with the activities of the Institution and having the expertise in engineering work and have shall be eligible to be the Fellow Member. Any such member applied for, the District Executive Committee shall prepare detailed particulars and submit to the Central Executive Committee. The CEC shall examine the information and nominate as Fellow Member and eventually award the Fellow Membership Certificate.

Donor Member 
(a) Any member engineer donating a fixed amount to the "Build construction fund" shall be entitled to be "Donor Member".

(b) Any person on being sympathized to the activities of IDEB donates 1 (One) Lac Taka to IDEB fund subjected to the approval of the central executive committee may be the donor member of IDEB.

Honorary Member 
A person who does not fulfill the conditions as mentioned in clause- 01 of Article- 03 (03.01) of constitution, but having sympathy with the objective and principles of this Institution or having some outstanding achievements in the field of Engineering and who assist in the healthy growth for development of the Institution, shall be eligible to be nominated Honorary Member of the Institution with the consent and Institution, provided that the number of such membership shall not be more than 1% (One Percent) of the total enrolled members. The Prime Minister of Bangladesh Sheikh Hasina  is Life time Honorary Member of IDEB .

Division & Cell

Study & Research Division 
IDEB formed a research and study cell to contribute to the nation and the people in the development works. This cell conducts studies on various issues and problems and suggests recommendations that may help the planners and policy makers to adopt appropriate policies and plans in the various technological fields like irrigation, flood control, roads and highways, electricity, energy, water logging in cities / towns, education, health, sanitation, housing and all other productive of commonalities. The institution has also been conducting activities viz. submitting memorandum, holding press conference, meeting with authorities to press the demands of the members and to correct and revise the wrong national policies, projects and programs etc.

ICT & Innovation Cell 
IDEB has a ICT & Innovation cell to empower its members in ICT & Encourage its members in Innovation Activity . This cell has young leadership with many success record . This cell has two wings IDEB Women's ICT Wing & Innovation Coordination committee.

IDEB Women's ICT Wing

Innovation Coordination committee

Library 
The IDEB maintain a library namely “IDEB Shadhinota Pathagar” at 2nd floor of IDEB Bhaban, 160/A, Kakrail VIP Road, Dhaka-1000, Bangladesh with various type of books viz. Engineering, Technology, Social Science, General Science, Philosophy, Historical and other disciplines. There is a fixed program to collect a number of books every year regularly to enrich the library.

IDEB member engineers and research person & students from different stage of society to visit the library regular for seeking knowledge by readout the reserved books. The management authority of library is proud for spreading knowledge to society by maintaining it. We are seeking whole hearten co-operation & help from government & non-government official, intellectual, writer & donor agencies for abounding the library.

Publication 
The IDEB publishes a socio-technological monthly journal named "KARIGAR" meaning "THE ARTISAN". A Board of Editors consisting of reputed and learned Diploma Engineers are entrusted with the publication of the journal. They select the quality articles for it. Besides, special supplement also published from time to time as and when necessary. Quite a good number of intellectuals contribute their articles regularly.

To create public awareness on regarding science and technology of this novel effort's already been quite welcome by the intellectual community of the society. The editorial panel of the Journal is working to improve the quality of the uninterrupted publications in demand of present era. To endless support & cooperation of many readers & admirers in the last half decade we are very pledge and go-ahead to reach our goal.

Conference 
IDEB has organized several National and International Conferences in Engineering,Technology & Education.

International Conference on TVET for Sustainable Development 2015 
International Conference on TVET for Sustainable Development was jointly organized by IDEB and CPSC,Manila . It was first international conference on Technical Voactional Education & Training (TVET) in Bangladesh.

International Conference on “Skills for the Future World of Work and TVET for Global Competitiveness 2017" 
The International Conference on “Skills for the Future World of Work and TVET for Global Competitiveness” has taken place in July 2017 at the Institution of Diploma Engineers Bangladesh (IDEB), Dhaka, Bangladesh. The conference was jointly organizing by IDEB and Colombo Plan Staff College (CPSC), Manila, Philippines. in Association with Ministry of Education (MoE) Government of Bangladesh, National Skills Development Council (NSDC) Where International Labour Organization (ILO), Directorate of Technical Education (DTE) and Bangladesh Technical Education Board, a2i, ESD Australia, IOM, PKSF, STEP,BMET, FBCCI, BEF was the Co-partner of the Conference .

This international conference was addressed the future demand of skilled manpower and the acceleration process to ensure the demand based quality Technical and Vocational Education & Training (TVET).

People's Engineering Day 
People's Engineering Day is being celebrated throughout the country on the founding anniversary day of the Institution of Diploma Engineer's Bangladesh (IDEB) on 8 November each year of the Headquarters and at all centers in a befitting manner to animate science & technology to the people. At the eve of the day, taken programs have been brought out to the Nation through News conference. Special supplementary is published in National Dailies and special picture broadcast participating leaders in Bangladesh Television and other Electronic Media. The messages are being given by Honorable President, Prime Minister, National Parliament Speaker, Opposition Leader, Member of Cabinet and different political parties' chief on the occasion. Colorful rally's being brought out by the participating member Engineers and polytechnic teachers and students. On the occasion of Peoples Engineering Day IDEB arranged week-wide program with various discussion meeting, seminar, technical lecture session on national issues and blood donation program is a regular program considering the distressed humanity.

References 

Engineering societies
Professional associations based in Bangladesh
Technological institutes of Bangladesh